Syarinus is a genus of pseudoscorpions in the family Syarinidae. There are about six described species in Syarinus.

Species
These six species belong to the genus Syarinus:
 Syarinus enhuycki Muchmore, 1968
 Syarinus granulatus Chamberlin, 1930
 Syarinus honestus Hoff, 1956
 Syarinus obscurus (Banks, 1893)
 Syarinus palmeni Kaisila, 1964
 Syarinus strandi (Ellingsen, 1901)

References

Further reading

 

Neobisioidea
Articles created by Qbugbot